Albert James Bradshaw (18 December 1882 – January 1956) was a Canadian politician, businessman and farmer. He was elected to the House of Commons of Canada as a Member of the Progressive Conservative Party in the 1945 election to represent the riding of Perth. He was defeated in the 1949 election.

External links

1882 births
1956 deaths
Members of the House of Commons of Canada from Ontario
Progressive Conservative Party of Canada MPs
Candidates in the 1949 Canadian federal election
Place of death missing